This is a list of diplomatic missions in Kiribati.  The capital, South Tarawa, hosts two high commissions and two embassies.

Embassies/High Commissions in South Tarawa

Former embassies/High commissions

 (closed in 2019)
 (closed in 2004)

Non-Resident Embassies

 (Canberra)
 (Canberra)
 (Wellington)
 (Wellington)
 (Tokyo)
 (Suva)
 (Kuala Lumpur)
 (Singapore)
 
 (Canberra)
 (Suva)
 (Canberra)
 (Wellington)
 (Canberra)
 (Suva)
 (Suva)
 (New York City)
 (Jerusalem)
 (Wellington)
 (Tokyo)
 (Suva)
 (Kuala Lumpur)
 (Canberra)
 (Wellington)
 (Canberra)
 (Port Moresby)
 (Canberra)
 (Canberra)
 (Canberra)
 (Jakarta)
 (Canberra)
 (Suva)
 (Wellington)
 (Canberra)
 (Canberra)
 (Canberra)
 (Suva)
 (Suva)
 (Wellington)
 (Suva)

See also
 Foreign relations of Kiribati

References

External links
Diplomatic missions in Kiribati

Foreign relations of Kiribati
Diplomatic missions
Kiribati
diplomatic missions